James David O'Blenis (born 1940) was a Royal Canadian Air Force officer. He served as deputy commander of NORAD from 1994 to 1995.

References

Canadian Forces Air Command generals
1940 births
Living people